Neovenatoridae is a proposed clade of carcharodontosaurian dinosaurs uniting some primitive members of the group such as Neovenator with the Megaraptora, a group of theropods with controversial affinities. Other studies recover megaraptorans as basal coelurosaurs unrelated to carcharodontosaurs. Other theropods with uncertain affinities such as Gualicho, Chilantaisaurus and Deltadromeus are also sometimes included.

Classification
Phylogenetic studies conducted by Benson, Carrano and Brusatte (2010) and Carrano, Benson and Sampson (2012) recovered the group Megaraptora as members of the Neovenatoridae. This would make neovenatorids the latest-surviving allosauroids; at least one megaraptoran, Orkoraptor, lived near the end of the Mesozoic era, dating to the early Maastrichtian stage of the latest Cretaceous period, about 70 million years ago. On the other hand, Novas et al. (2012), while confirming that Neovenator was closely related to carcharodontosaurids, simultaneously found Megaraptor and related genera to be coelurosaurs closely related to tyrannosaurids. However, Novas et al. subsequently found that megaraptorans lacked most of the key features in the hands of derived coelurosaurs including Guanlong and Deinonychus. Instead, their hands retain a number of primitive characteristics seen in basal tetanurans such as Allosaurus. Nevertheless, there are still a number of other traits that support megaraptorans as members of the Coelurosauria.

The cladogram below follows a 2016 analysis by Sebastián Apesteguía, Nathan D. Smith, Rubén Juarez Valieri, and Peter J. Makovicky based on the dataset of Carrano et al. (2012).

References

 
Carcharodontosauria
Prehistoric dinosaur families